The 1963–64 NBA season was the Warriors' 18th season in the NBA and second in San Francisco.

The Warriors were led by superstar center Wilt Chamberlain and renowned playmaker Guy Rodgers, both of whom were named to their second-consecutive all-star games during the season. The Warriors were also aided by rookie draft pick Nate Thurmond as well as veterans Tom Meschery and Al Attles, and were coached by newcomer Alex Hannum. The Warriors won 48 games in the regular season, and beat the St. Louis Hawks in a tough seven game series during the conference finals to advance to the NBA Finals, in only their second season as a San Francisco team. They were ousted in five games by the Boston Celtics in the NBA Championship.

Roster

<noinclude>

Regular season

Season standings 

x – clinched playoff spot

Record vs. opponents

Game log

Footnotes

 The game was held at the Oakland Civic Auditorium in Oakland, California.
 The game was held at Madison Square Garden in New York, New York.
 The game was held at Boston Garden in Boston, Massachusetts.
 The game was held at Sacramento High School in Sacramento, California.
 The game was held at The Field House in Toledo, Ohio.

 The game was held at Richmond Memorial Auditorium in Richmond, California.
 The game was held at San Jose Civic Auditorium in San Jose, California.
 The game was held at Cleveland Arena, in Cleveland, Ohio.
 The game was held at Lansing Civic Center in Lansing, Michigan.

Playoffs 

|-  style="text-align:center; background:#fcc;"
| 1
| April 1
| St. Louis
| L 111–116
| Wilt Chamberlain (37)
| Wilt Chamberlain (22)
| Guy Rodgers (11)
| War Memorial Gymnasium5,231
| 0–1
|-  style="text-align:center; background:#cfc;"
| 2
| April 3
| St. Louis
| W 120–85
| Wilt Chamberlain (28)
| Wilt Chamberlain (27)
| Guy Rodgers (8)
| Cow Palace9,063
| 1–1
|-  style="text-align:center; background:#fcc;"
| 3
| April 5
| @ St. Louis
| L 109–113
| Wilt Chamberlain (46)
| Wilt Chamberlain (23)
| Phillips, Rodgers (4)
| Kiel Auditorium10,163
| 1–2
|-  style="text-align:center; background:#cfc;"
| 4
| April 8
| @ St. Louis
| W 111–109
| Wilt Chamberlain (36)
| Wilt Chamberlain (23)
| Guy Rodgers (8)
| Kiel Auditorium10,118
| 2–2
|-  style="text-align:center; background:#cfc;"
| 5
| April 10
| St. Louis
| W 121–97
| Wilt Chamberlain (50)
| Chamberlain, Thurmond (15)
| Guy Rodgers (12)
| Cow Palace10,628
| 3–2
|-  style="text-align:center; background:#fcc;"
| 6
| April 12
| @ St. Louis
| L 95–123
| Wilt Chamberlain (34)
| Wilt Chamberlain (24)
| Guy Rodgers (7)
| Kiel Auditorium8,967
| 3–3
|-  style="text-align:center; background:#cfc;"
| 7
| April 16
| St. Louis
| W 105–95
| Wilt Chamberlain (39)
| Wilt Chamberlain (30)
| Guy Rodgers (8)
| Cow Palace8,923
| 4–3
|-

|-  style="text-align:center; background:#fcc;"
| 1
| April 18
| @ Boston
| L 96–108
| Wilt Chamberlain (22)
| Wilt Chamberlain (23)
| Guy Rodgers (8)
| Boston Garden13,909
| 0–1
|-  style="text-align:center; background:#fcc;"
| 2
| April 20
| @ Boston
| L 101–124
| Wilt Chamberlain (32)
| Wilt Chamberlain (25)
| Phillips, Rodgers (4)
| Boston Garden13,909
| 0–2
|-  style="text-align:center; background:#cfc;"
| 3
| April 22
| Boston
| W 115–91
| Wilt Chamberlain (35)
| Wilt Chamberlain (25)
| Guy Rodgers (7)
| Cow Palace10,981
| 1–2
|-  style="text-align:center; background:#fcc;"
| 4
| April 24
| Boston
| L 95–98
| Wilt Chamberlain (27)
| Wilt Chamberlain (38)
| Guy Rodgers (6)
| Cow Palace14,862
| 1–3
|-  style="text-align:center; background:#fcc;"
| 5
| April 26
| @ Boston
| L 99–105
| Wilt Chamberlain (30)
| Wilt Chamberlain (27)
| Guy Rodgers (7)
| Boston Garden13,909
| 1–4
|-

Awards and records 
 Wilt Chamberlain: NBA All-Star Game, NBA scoring champion, All-NBA First Team
 Alex Hannum: NBA Coach of the Year Award
 Nate Thurmond, NBA All-Rookie Team 1st Team

References

Golden State Warriors seasons
San Francisco
Golden
Golden